Doug Shanahan (born January 11, 1979) is a lacrosse coach and player. He has been inducted into four Halls of Fame and has won a number of other trophies and accolades. He was twice a member of Team USA, and also won MVP of the world games. He attended Hofstra University, playing both football and lacrosse in college.

Hofstra University
From 1997 to 2001 Shanahan played both lacrosse and football. As a defensive back for the Pride, Shanahan was recognized as a 3 time All American in football. In 2000, he was also a Buck Buchanan Award finalist which is given to the top defensive player in Division 1AA.  Following his senior year, he was signed as a free agent with the New York Jets. The Jets allowed Shanahan to go with Team USA and compete in the World Lacrosse Championships in Perth, Australia. Shanahan turned down several football offers from the Canadian Football League to pursue his career in the MLL. At Hofstra, Shanahan also was a 3 time All American in lacrosse, was named the NCAA National Player of the Year and won the McLaughlin Award as the nation's top midfielder. In 1997, he was named the America East rookie of the year. In 2001, he was the inaugural winner of the Tewaaraton Trophy, which is presented yearly to the nation's top college player.

Pro career

Lacrosse
Shanahan was a member of the 2002 U.S. World Lacrosse Championship title team, in which he received All-World and Championship MVP honors.  He was also a member of the 2006 USA World Lacrosse team.

He was drafted by the Bridgeport Barrage (1st overall) in the 2002 MLL Supplemental Draft. He played with Barrage through the 2005 season, helping them capture the 2004 Major League Lacrosse Championship.  He was acquired by the Chicago Machine in the 2006 Expansion Draft (1st round, 4th pick) from Philadelphia.

Shanahan also played a half season during the New York Saints last year of the National Lacrosse League in 2002, where he recorded 7 goals and 4 assists in 8 games.

Football
In 2002, Shanahan signed a contract with the New York Jets for training camp.

Coaching experience
Shanahan was head coach of the Glenbrook South Titans of Glenview, Illinois from 2006 to 2008. In his inaugural year as head coach, Shanahan led the Titans to a 4th-place finish in the IHSLA Lacrosse state championship tournament. In his two years at Glenbrook South, Shanahan lead the Titans to the playoffs and finished with an overall record of 26-10. In 2008, Shanahan also coached lacrosse at the University of Illinois, where he led the team to an 11-7 record his first year. That year, the Illini finished in MCLA Division 1 with a ranking of 21st in the nation. In 2009, Doug Shanahan signed on as the new head coach for the Fort Lauderdale, Florida Pine Crest Panthers, leading them to a 12-6 record. Similar to his high school and college days, Doug also was a part of the football squad as the Quarterback coach. In 2013, Shanahan left Pine Crest to coach at St. Thomas Aquinas as Asst Head Coach. Shanahan took the Raiders to the Final Four in 2014. Shanahan coached at St Brendan as Asst. Athletic Director and Head Lacrosse Coach in the fall of 2014 & 2015.
In 2017, Shanahan moved back to Broward County, Florida to coach the Western Wildcats. In his first season of coaching at Western, the school won its first ever Lacrosse District Championship. In 2019, he was named as the coach of Team England.

After Lacrosse
Shanahan taught at Pine Crest Preparatory School in Ft. Lauderdale for five years. He is a teacher and boys lacrosse coach.  In 2014 he was the lacrosse coach at St Brendan High School Miami, Florida and the assistant Athletic Director. In June 2015, it was announced that Shanahan would be joining Legacy Travel Intl. as a lacrosse consultant. He is now the P.E coach at Imagine Charter School at Weston in Weston, Fl. He is also running a lacrosse camp.

Statistics

MLL

Hofstra University

Awards

References

External links
Laxpower.com Illinois Illini 2008 season
Laxpower.com Glenbrook South Titans 2007 season
Laxpower.com Pine Crest Panthers 2009 season

1979 births
Living people
American lacrosse players
Hofstra Pride men's lacrosse players
Hofstra Pride football players
Major League Lacrosse players
People from Farmingville, New York
Sportspeople from New York (state)